Palus is a city and municipal council in sangli district.Palus is developed city in Sangli district. City have best industrial zone, steel firms, foundries and Machine shop.

In Palus, Grapes production is also done on a very large scale and grapes of Palus are widely known. The grapes here are also sold abroad. 

Grapes are grown here using new technologies and different methods.

Industrial zone & MIDC
The industrial zone of Palus produces foundry components. It is home to the Krishna Valley Wine Park, Krishna-verala spinningmills and a marketplace with hardware and construction shops.

India's second oldest industrial township kirloskarwadi is located in palus taluka.

Kirloskar Brothers is located about 4 kilometers from Palus. Corporations are located in Kirloskarwadi include Kirloskar Ebara Pumps limited (kepl) , kirloskar brothers limited and other steelwork firms.

Education 
 The Laxmanrao Kirloskar School & Junior College.
 Bharti vidyapeeth college of engineering.
 Pandit Vishnu digambar school and college
 ASC college Palus
 Government ITI palus
 Shri Samarth English medium school
 Takshila School 
And Many more schools, colleges, academies are situated in palus & surrounding area.

Attractive places to visit 
Attractions in the Palus area include the 
Sagareshwar Wildlife Sanctuary
 Grapes farm
 Famous Milk dairies in large scale situated here
 Shree kshetra audumbar
 Krishna ghat, Bhilawadi
 Hanuman temple, pundi
 Palus market
 the fair of palus is famous .

Hindustani classical vocalist Vishnu Digambar Paluskar (1872-1931) was born there.

Temples 
 Dhondiraj Maharaj Math/Mandir
 H. Daval Malik (Baba) Dargah
 Old Vitthal Temple
 New Vitthal Temple
 Shivling Temple
 Nag Temple
 Birudeo Temple
 Hanuman Temple
 Gram Daivat Padmavati Mandir

Villages 
The villages in the Tehsil include:
 Amanapur
 Andhali
 Ankalkhop
 Anugdewadi
 Audumbar
 Bambavade
 Bhilawadi
 Bramhanal
 Burli
 Burungwadi
 Chopdewadi
 Dahyari
 Dudhondi
 Ghogaon
 Hajarwadi
 Khandobachiwadi
 Khatav
 Kirloskarwadi
 Kundal
 Malwadi
 Morale
 Nagrale
 Nagthane
 Palus
 Pundi Tarf Walava
 Pundiwadi
 Ramanandnagar
 Sandgewadi
 Sandgewadi MIDC area
 Santgaon
 Sawantpur
 Shere Dudhondi
 Sukhwadi
 Surygaon
 Tavdarwadi
 Tupari
 Vitthalwadi
 Vasgade

Transport
Palus is served by the following transport infrastructure:
By Air:-
 Kolhapur Airport is situated around 60 kilometers from Palus

 Kirloskarvadi airstrip which is eligible for helicopters, small planes and jets.

By Rail :-

 Kirloskarwadi Station (Palus) is the nearest railway station to Palus. This is located in The Central Railway Zone of Indian Railways.

 Bhilawadi (Palus) railway station.

 Amnapur (Palus) railway station

 Nearest railway junction miraj 44 km

References

Cities and towns in Sangli district
Talukas in Maharashtra